Marianna "Muffy" Davis (born December 1, 1972) is an American politician, former Paralympic cyclist, and alpine skier who served as a member of the Idaho House of Representatives for the 26A district from 2018 to 2021.

Early life and education
Davis was born in Sun Valley, Idaho. She was a top ranking junior skier and was poised to be named to the US ski team when an accident at the age of 16 left her paralyzed from the chest down. She earned a Bachelor of Science degree in human biology from Stanford University in 1995.

Career 
Davis has traveled widely and competed in a number of disciplines. She won the bronze medal in slalom at the 1998 Winter Paralympics in Nagano, Japan. In 2000, she was the World Champion at Giant Slalom in Anzere, Switzerland. Davis won three silver medals competing in the 2002 Winter Paralympics in Salt Lake City, Utah (downhill, super G, giant slalom). Davis retired from skiing in 2002.  On June 1, 2002, she was in a team of four disabled climbers who reached the summit of the  Mount Shasta in California. Davis was the first female paraplegic to climb a peak over 14,000 feet. The journey was possible by using a Snowpod which is a hand cranked tracked snowmobile devised by Pete Rieke.  Davis was awarded Endurance Sports Disabled Athlete of the Year in 2002 and IOC Presidents Disable Athlete Award in 2004.

Davis took up the sport of handcycling in 2010, and was named to the U.S. Paracycling National Team.  On September 7, 2012, she won three gold medals at 2012 Summer Paralympics for individual H1-3 road race, H1-4 team relay, and H1-2 individual time trial. In August 2013, Davis won 1st place for road race and time trial at the UCI Para-cycling Road World Championships in Baie-Comeau.

Elections

2020 
Davis was unopposed for the Democratic primary and the general election.

2018 
Davis was unopposed for the Democratic primary. Davis defeated incumbent Republican Steve Miller with 56.3% of the vote.

References

Living people
1972 births
Paralympic cyclists of the United States
People from Sun Valley, Idaho
Sit-skiers
Medalists at the 2012 Summer Paralympics
Cyclists at the 2012 Summer Paralympics
Medalists at the 1998 Winter Paralympics
Medalists at the 2002 Winter Paralympics
Alpine skiers at the 1998 Winter Paralympics
Alpine skiers at the 2002 Winter Paralympics
American female cyclists
American female alpine skiers
Paralympic gold medalists for the United States
Paralympic silver medalists for the United States
Democratic Party members of the Idaho House of Representatives
Politicians with paraplegia
Cyclists from Idaho
Stanford University alumni
American politicians with disabilities
21st-century American politicians
21st-century American women politicians
American athlete-politicians
Paralympic medalists in alpine skiing
Paralympic medalists in cycling
Paralympic alpine skiers of the United States
Women state legislators in Idaho